The 1932 Detroit Tigers season ended with them placing fifth in the American League with a record of 76–75, 29½ games behind the New York Yankees.

Regular season

Season standings

Record vs. opponents

Roster

Player stats

Batting

Starters by position 
Note: Pos = Position; G = Games played; AB = At bats; H = Hits; Avg. = Batting average; HR = Home runs; RBI = Runs batted in

Other batters 
Note: G = Games played; AB = At bats; H = Hits; Avg. = Batting average; HR = Home runs; RBI = Runs batted in

Pitching

Starting pitchers 
Note: G = Games pitched; IP = Innings pitched; W = Wins; L = Losses; ERA = Earned run average; SO = Strikeouts

Other pitchers 
Note: G = Games pitched; IP = Innings pitched; W = Wins; L = Losses; ERA = Earned run average; SO = Strikeouts

Relief pitchers 
Note: G = Games pitched; W = Wins; L = Losses; SV = Saves; ERA = Earned run average; SO = Strikeouts

Farm system 

LEAGUE CHAMPIONS: Beaumont

Decatur club folded, July 12, 1932

Notable events
 On August 5 against the Washington Senators, pitcher Tommy Bridges came within one out of a perfect game, retiring the first 26 batters before the Senators' Dave Harris hit a pinch-hit single. Bridges retired the 28th batter, Sam Rice and the Tigers won 13–0. No MLB pitcher was subsequently to come so close to a perfect game until Don Larsen achieved the feat in the 1956 World Series.

Notes

External links 

1932 Detroit Tigers season at Baseball Reference

Detroit Tigers seasons
Detroit Tigers season
Detroit Tigers
1932 in Detroit